The inorganic imides are compounds containing an ion composed of nitrogen bonded to hydrogen with formula HN2−. Organic imides have the NH group, and two single or one double covalent bond to other atoms. The imides are related to the inorganic amides (H2N−), the nitrides (N3−) and the nitridohydrides (N3−•H−).

In addition to solid state imides, molecular imides are also known in dilute gases, where their spectrum can be studied.

Imide can be a ligand, with a double bond to a metal such as molybdenum (e.g. Mo=NH). As a ligand it is called imido. The imido ligand is part of a nitrogen fixation cycle: Mo•N2 → Mo-N=N− → Mo-N=NH (diazenido) → Mo-N=NH2+ → Mo=N-NH2 (hydrazido) → Mo=N-NH3+  (hydrazidium) → Mo≡N (nitrido) + NH3 → Mo≡NH+ → Mo=NH (imido) → Mo=NH2+ → Mo-NH2 (amido) → Mo-NH3+ → Mo•NH3 (ammine); with the oxidation state of molybdenum varying to accommodate the number bonds from nitrogen.

When the hydrogen of the imide group is substituted by an organic group, an organoimide results. Complexes of actinide and rare earth elements with organoimides are known.

Properties
Lithium imide undergoes a phase transition at 87 °C where it goes from an ordered to a more symmetric disordered state.

Structure
Many imides have a cubic rock salt structure, with the metal and nitrogen occupying the main positions. The position of the hydrogen atom is hard to determine, but is disordered.

Many of the heavy metal simple imide molecules are linear. This is due to the filled 2p orbital of nitrogen donating electrons to an empty d orbital on the metal.

Formation
Heating lithium amide with lithium hydride yields lithium imide and hydrogen gas. This reaction takes place as released ammonia reacts with lithium hydride.

Heating magnesium amide to about 400 °C yields magnesium imide with the loss of ammonia. Magnesium imide itself decomposes if heated between 455 and 490 °C.

Beryllium imide forms from beryllium amide when heated to 230 °C in a vacuum.

When strontium metal is heated with ammonia at 750 °C, the dark yellow strontium imide forms.

When barium vapour is heated with ammonia in an electrical discharge, the gaseous, molecular BaNH is formed. Molecules ScNH, YNH, and LaNH are also known.

Hydrogen storage
Inorganic imides are of interest because they can reversibly store hydrogen, which may be important for the hydrogen economy. For example, calcium imide can store 2.1% mass of hydrogen. Li2Ca(NH)2 reversibly stores hydrogen and release it at temperatures between 140 and 206 °C. It can reversibly hold 2.3% hydrogen. When hydrogen is added to the imide, amides and hydrides are produced. When imides are heated, they can yield hydridonitrides or nitrides, but these may not easily reabsorb hydrogen.

List

Ionic

Molecular

Molecular imines of other actinides called neptunimine and plutonimine have been postulated to exist in the gas phase or noble gas matrix.

References

Nitrogen compounds
Hydrogen compounds